TIMARA (Technology in Music and Related Arts) is a program at the Oberlin Conservatory of Music notable for its importance in the history of electronic music. Established in 1967, TIMARA is well known as the world's first conservatory program in electronic music. Department alumni have included Cory Arcangel, Christopher Rouse, Dary John Mizelle, Dan Forden and Amy X Neuburg.

The major in Technology in Music and Related Arts is intended for students who desire a career in which traditional musical skills and understanding are combined with the exploration of the very latest techniques for musical expression. The program prepares a student for specialized graduate study in computer music, digital media and new performance.

Early history
Oberlin's extensive history with electronic music dates back to the mid-19th century due to its relationship with inventor Elisha Gray. Gray, considered to be the father of the modern music synthesizer, served as adjunct professor of physics at Oberlin  and following his tenure, was granted over 70 patents for his inventions.

Grey's electromechanical oscillator paved the way for another Oberlin physicist, Thaddeus Cahill, who created the telharmonium in 1877. The instrument, although no recordings have survived, is considered one of the first electronic instruments to garner international attention.

The TIMARA department was officially founded in 1967 by composer Olly Wilson as a response to the number of composition students who pursued studies in electronics. The program became the first in a series of departments in American universities to allow for experimentation in analog synthesis as well as mixed media art.

Current History
TIMARA now boasts two ensembles, OINC (Oberlin Improvisation and Newmusic Collective)  and WAM (Women in Arts and Music). Its current faculty include professors Peter Swendsen, Tom Lopez, Aurie Hsu, and technical director and lecturer Abby Aresty.  Recent faculty include the engineer John Talbert as well as composers Morton Subotnik, George Lewis, David Lang, Gary Lee Nelson, Per Bloland, Joo Won Park and Lyn Goeringer.

TIMARA Laboratories
The TIMARA Laboratories consist of five studios, each containing a state of the art audio workstation. Additional labs contain the department's extensive collection of instruments including original models of the ARP 2600, the Buchla 200 and the EMS VCS 3. A secondary public lab contains multiple audio workstations that can be used to edit and process audio and video. The workstations can be used to transfer audio between formats, or create and edit creative projects. Each workstation has a Yamaha DX7, a mixer and an M-Box. The workstations run ProTools, Max/MSP, Amadeus, Peak, and other programs.

The laboratory was the recording location of Josh Ritter's eponymous debut album, as well as the original recordings of The Mars Volta, Chris Eldridge, The Yeah Yeah Yeahs and Liz Phair.

The lab was also the space where REAPER, a digital audio workstation, was first created.

Alles Machine
The Bell Labs Digital Synthesizer, better known as the Alles Machine or Alice, was an experimental additive synthesizer designed by Hal Alles at Bell Labs during the 1970s. The Alles Machine, the world's first digital additive synthesizer, used 72 computer controlled oscillators whose output was mixed to produce a number of discrete "voices." Only one full-length composition was recorded for the machine, before being acquired by TIMARA in 1981. Several commercial synthesizers based on the Alles design were released during the 1980s, including the Atari AMY sound chip.

References

Oberlin College
Experimental music
Computer music
Music organizations based in the United States
Electronic music organizations
Contemporary music organizations
Classical music in the United States
Organizations established in 1967